Ernst Schering may refer to:
Ernst Christian Friedrich Schering (1824–1889), German apothecary and industrialist who created the Schering Corporation
Ernst Christian Julius Schering (1833–1897), German mathematician from Göttingen